Aethiopicodynerus punctiventris is a species of wasp in the family Vespidae. It was described by Gusenleitner in 2002.

References

Potter wasps
Insects described in 2002